Christian Emil Tue Jensen (born 9 March 2000) is a Danish professional footballer who plays for KuPS as an attacking midfielder.

Jensen is a product of the FC Midtjylland academy and played his first senior football on loan at FC Fredericia. He transferred to KuPS in 2022. Capped by Denmark at youth level, Jensen has been described as "a forward capable of waspish delivery with his right foot".

Club career

FC Midtjylland and loans 
An attacking midfielder or winger, Jensen began his career in the academy at Superliga club FC Midtjylland at age 13. He signed his first professional contract in January 2017 and signed a new five-year contract in June 2018. On 21 June 2019, Jensen moved to England to join the B team at Championship club Brentford on loan for the duration of the 2019–20 season. He was deployed as a forward.

On 11 August 2020, Jensen joined Danish 1st Division club FC Fredericia on loan for the duration of the 2020–21 season. He top-scored with 10 goals in 29 appearances to help the team to a fifth-place finish in the 1st Division's promotion group. In June 2021, Jensen rejoined FC Fredericia on loan for the 2021–22 season and scored three goals in 29 appearances during a campaign in which the club repeated its finish from the previous season. Jensen transferred away from FC Midtjylland in July 2022.

KuPS 
On 4 July 2022, Jensen transferred to Veikkausliiga club KuPS and signed an 18-month contract, with the option of a further year. He became eligible to play on 13 July 2022 and made seven appearances during the remainder of the 2022 season. He was a part of the club's 2022 Finnish Cup-winning squad.

International career 
Jensen was capped by Denmark at youth level.

Career statistics

Honours 
KuPS

 Finnish Cup: 2022

References

External links 

 
 
 
 
 Christian Tue Jensen at palloliitto.fi

Danish men's footballers
Denmark youth international footballers
Danish expatriates in England
Danish expatriate men's footballers
Expatriate footballers in England
FC Midtjylland players
Brentford F.C. players
Living people
2000 births
Place of birth missing (living people)
Danish 1st Division players
FC Fredericia players
Association football midfielders
Association football wingers
Kuopion Palloseura players
Veikkausliiga players
Kakkonen players